The Molí d'en Rata Heritage Interpretation Centre, in Ripollet (Vallès Occidental), is a municipal facility dedicated to research into and the conservation, management and diffusion of the heritage of Ripollet. It encompasses two areas: the Molí d'en Rata (En Rata mill), one of El Vallès Occidental’s last operational flour mills, and the Heritage Interpretation Centre, a newly constructed building with two exhibition rooms: one for the permanent exhibition and the other for temporary exhibitions. It is part of the Barcelona Provincial Council Local Museum Network.

Permanent exhibition
The interpretation centre's permanent exhibition includes three areas: 
 El pa de la diversitat (The bread of diversity):
This area is part of the visit to the old En Rata flourmill and explains how grain was changed into flour in a hydraulic flourmill.

 Protagonistes: ripolletencs que deixen petjada (Leaders: people from Ripollet who left their mark):
This area recognises seven people born or connected with Ripollet who made their mark in their profession beyond Catalonia's borders: a painter, a sculptor and painter, a sculptor, a castanet performer, a tenor, a basketball player and a scientist.

 Ripollet i la mesura del temps (Ripollet and the test of time):
The exhibition explains the workings of the old bell tower clock of Sant Esteve de Ripollet.

References

External links
 Molí d'en Rata Heritage Interpretation Centre blog
 Local Museum Network site

Barcelona Provincial Council Local Museum Network
Buildings and structures in Vallès Occidental
Industry museums in Catalonia
Flour mills
Mill museums in Spain